Man on a Tightrope is a 1953 American drama directed by Elia Kazan, starring Fredric March and Terry Moore and Gloria Grahame. The screenplay by Robert E. Sherwood was based on a 1952 novel of the same title by Neil Paterson. Paterson based his true story, which first appeared as the magazine novelette International Incident, on the escape of the Circus Brumbach from East Germany in 1950. Members of the Circus Brumbach appeared in the film version in both character roles and as extras.  The film has was entered into the 3rd Berlin International Film Festival.

Plot
In 1952 Czechoslovakia, circus man Karel Černík struggles to keep his beloved Cirkus Černík together, which belonged to his family before being nationalized by the Communist government. The government allows Černík to manage the circus, but he grapples with its deteriorating conditions, loss of his workers to the state, tension with his willful daughter Tereza, and his young second wife Zama, whom everyone suspects of being unfaithful. Černík wants to end a budding romance between Tereza and roustabout Joe Vosdek, who has been with the circus for only a year.

Černík is interrogated at the headquarters of the S.N.B. state security in Pilzen on why he is not performing the Marxist propaganda acts dictated by the government. Černík explains that the skits were not funny, and that audiences prefer his usual act. The S.N.B. chief orders him to resume the required act, and to dismiss a longtime trouper who calls herself "The Duchess". Propaganda minister Fesker casually asks him about a radio in his trailer, alerting Černík to a spy in his midst. Černík is fined and released, although Fesker believes that he is a threat to the state.

Černík, inspired by a recent spate of escapes from behind the Iron Curtain, has decided to escape over the border to Bavaria. Černík suspects that Joe is the spy, but unknown to him, Tereza has learned that Joe is actually a deserter from the American Army who is planning an escape attempt of his own. Černík's longtime rival Barovik visits and reveals that he knows of the escape plan. Barovik assures Černík that because they are both circus men, that he will not betray him. Černík agrees to leave behind most of his equipment for Barovik. Realizing that he must act swiftly, Černík discovers that Krofta, who has worked for Černík for twenty years, is actually the spy. Černík ties up Krofta but is confronted by Fesker about a travel permit, which he issues to catch Černík in the act of trying to escape. Fesker is about to pursue the circus when he is arrested by a commissar sergeant for issuing the travel permit.

Joe reveals himself to Černík, who incorporates him into the plan. At the border crossing, Krofta escapes, but is stopped by Černík from warning the border guards. In the fracas Krofta mortally wounds him. Using an audacious and violent dash across the only bridge, most of the circus safely escape only to be told that Černík has paid with his life. Obeying his dying wish, Zama orders the troupe to march on.

Cast
 Fredric March as Karel Černík
 Terry Moore as Tereza Černík
 Gloria Grahame as Zama Černík
 Cameron Mitchell as Joe Vosdek
 Adolphe Menjou as Fesker
 Robert Beatty as Barović
 Alexander D'Arcy as Rudolph
 Richard Boone as Krofta
 Pat Henning as Konradin
 Paul Hartman as Jaromír
 John Dehner as the SNB chief

Production
The film was shot on location in Bavaria, then in West Germany. Authentic acts were used, and the entire Circus Brumbach was employed for the production. The original plot to escape in small increments across the border was the actual means used by the Circus Brumbach in their escape.

References

External links 
 
 
 
 
 A.W. "Man on a Tightrope (1953)", New York Times film review, June 5, 1953

1953 films
20th Century Fox films
American drama films
American black-and-white films
Circus films
Cold War films
1950s English-language films
Films scored by Franz Waxman
Films critical of communism
Films based on British novels
Films directed by Elia Kazan
Films set in East Germany
Films set in West Germany
Films set in the Czech Republic
1953 drama films
1950s American films